Her Scrambled Ambition was an American silent short comedy film produced by United States Motion Picture Corporation under the name Black Diamond Comedy. The film starred Leatrice Joy, and was released February 1, 1917 by Paramount Pictures.

Preservation status
No prints of this film are known to survive.

Synopsis 
The film follows the story of Susie (Joy), who, upon learning the vast amounts of money to be made in show business, decides she wants to be a star. She sees an ad in club saying “Comedian Wanted” and decides to apply. She gets a try-out and then completes a series of tasks which delight the director who wants to try her in the real scene.  They return to the studio where Sue is put into a scene where she is supposed to be kidnapped by some rough men. The director tells her to fight back and she takes his words to heart.

In true comedic fashion, Sue fights back hard and destroys not only the set she is on but a neighboring one as well. The director tells the gang to stop her and when they try she begins pulling bricks from an archway and throwing them at her assaulters. Eventually, the arch is so weakened that it falls on top of her, burying her. The director rescues her and says the job is hers. She is so excited and asks what her pay will be, however when the director tells her only $9.00 a week she picks up a brick and knocks herself out.

References

External links
 

Lost American films
1917 films
1917 comedy films
Silent American comedy films
American silent short films
American black-and-white films
Films shot in Pennsylvania
Paramount Pictures short films
1917 short films
American comedy short films
1917 lost films
Lost comedy films
1910s American films